Margaret of Brandenburg (1270–1315) was the daughter of Albert III, Margrave of Brandenburg-Salzwedel; wife first of Przemysł II and second of Albert III, Duke of Saxe-Lauenburg

Margaret of Brandenburg may also refer to:

Margaret of Brandenburg (1410–1465), daughter of Frederick I, Elector of Brandenburg; wife in turn to Albrecht V of Mecklenburg, Louis VIII, Duke of Bavaria, and Martin von Waldenfels
Margaret of Brandenburg (1450–1489), daughter of Frederick II, Elector of Brandenburg; wife of Bogislaw X, Duke of Pomerania
Margaret of Brandenburg (1453–1509), princess of Brandenburg by birth and abbess of the Poor Clares monastery at Hof 
Margaret of Brandenburg (1511–1577), daughter of Joachim I Nestor, Elector of Brandenburg; wife first of George I, Duke of Pomerania-Wolgast and second of John V, Prince of Anhalt-Zerbst